Blonde in Bondage (Swedish: Blondin i fara) is a 1957 Swedish drama crime film directed by Robert Brandt, who also wrote lyrics to the film's two songs.  Distributors Corporation of America released the film in the US as a double feature with The Flesh Is Weak. It was shot at the Metronome Studios in Stockholm.

Plot
New York City reporter Larry Brand is sent to Stockholm to do a story on Swedish morals.  A traffic accident leads him into rescuing a strip tease artiste from drug addiction and pits him against a ruthless criminal gang.

Cast
Mark Miller as Larry Brand
Anita Thallaug as Mona Mace
Lars Ekborg as Max
Ruth Johansson as Laila 
Birgitta Ander as Birgitta 
Eva Laräng as Ingrid
Anita Strindberg as Telephone operator (credited as Anita Edberg)
Erik Strandmark as Olle
Stig Järrel as Kreuger
Börje Mellvig as Chief Inspector
Dangy Helander as a Prostitute
Norma Sjöholm as a second Prostitute
Sangrid Nerf as a taxi driver
Alexander von Baumgarten as Kuger's valet
John Starck ...  Chief of guards

Soundtrack
 The Blues Music by Ulf CarlénLyrics by Robert Brandt
Shock Around the ClockMusic by Ulf Carlén Lyrics by Robert Brandt

External links

1957 films
1950s Swedish-language films
1957 crime drama films
Swedish crime drama films
Swedish black-and-white films
Films about heroin addiction
Films shot in Sweden
Films set in Stockholm
1950s Swedish films